Rondale DaSean Moore (born June 9, 2000) is an American football wide receiver for the Arizona Cardinals of the National Football League (NFL). He played college football at Purdue, and was drafted by the Cardinals in the second round of the 2021 NFL Draft.

Early life
Moore was born in New Albany, Indiana on June 9, 2000.  He grew up on the same block as NBA player Romeo Langford and the two played basketball together until their sophomore year of high school. He attended New Albany High School where he was part of the 2016 4A Indiana State basketball championship team with Langford before transferring to Trinity High School where he was a four-star football recruit. In June 2017, he committed to play at the University of Texas at Austin but later chose to attend Purdue University.

College career
In his first game with the Boilermakers, and his first game overall, Moore's 313-yard all-purpose yards was the record for most in program history, higher than Otis Armstrong, who had 312 in 1972. In that same game, Moore had a 76-yard rush to score a touchdown that evened the score at 14–14. The Boilermakers eventually lost the game, 31–27. On September 3, 2018, Moore was named the Co-Freshman of the Week in the Big Ten Conference. On September 24, 2018, Moore was once again named Big Ten Freshman of the Week. On October 22, 2018, Moore was once again named the Big Ten Freshman of the Week. On November 25, 2018, Moore was named the Big Ten Freshman of the Week for a fourth time.

At the conclusion of the 2018 regular season, Moore had recorded 1,164 receiving yards and 203 rushing yards to go along with thirteen combined touchdowns. Moore's 2,048 all-purpose yards were the most since Dorien Bryant recorded 2,121 in 2007, and the second most in school history.

Awards 
At the end of the 2018 season, Moore was the recipient of the Paul Hornung Award, given to the most versatile player in all of college football. Moore was also named a First-Team All-American by The Athletic, a well-regarded sporting website but not one of the members of the All-American voting process.

On December 10, 2018, Moore was named a First-Team All-American by the Associated Press as an all-purpose back. On December 11, 2018, Moore was named a First-Team All-American by the Football Writers' Association of America. On December 12, 2018, The Sporting News named Moore to their second-team, making Moore a consensus All-American.

On December 12, 2018, Moore was named the CBS Sports Freshman of the Year.

Statistics

Professional career

Moore was selected by the Arizona Cardinals in the second round with the 49th overall pick in the 2021 NFL Draft. He signed his four-year rookie contract with Arizona on June 9, 2021.

Moore entered the 2021 season fourth on the Cardinals wide receiver depth chart. In his second career game, Moore scored his first NFL touchdown on a 77-yard pass from Kyler Murray in the second quarter against the Minnesota Vikings. He finished the season with 54 catches for 435 yards and one touchdown.

After missing the first three games due to a hamstring injury, Moore made his 2022 debut in Week 4. He started the next eight games before being placed on injured reserve on December 14, 2022. Moore finished the 2022 season with 41 receptions for 414 receiving yards and one receiving touchdown.

References

External links

Arizona Cardinals bio
Purdue Boilermakers bio

Living people
2000 births
All-American college football players
American football wide receivers
Arizona Cardinals players
People from New Albany, Indiana
Players of American football from Indiana
Players of American football from Louisville, Kentucky
Purdue Boilermakers football players
Trinity High School (Louisville) alumni